Caple Donaldson (5 October 1966 – January 2008 ) was a Jamaican former footballer who was last known to have played as a striker for Reno.

Career

Donaldson started his career with Jamaican side Reno, helping them win 3 consecutive top flight titles, their only top flight titles. In 2009, Donaldson's number 7 jersey was retired after his death.

References

External links

 

Jamaican footballers
Jamaica international footballers
Living people
1966 births
2008 deaths
Association football forwards
FC Reno players
1991 CONCACAF Gold Cup players